Torodora spinula is a moth in the family Lecithoceridae described by Kyu-Tek Park in 2002. It is endemic to the Thai provinces of Chiang Mai and Nakhon Nayok.

References

Torodora
Moths of Asia
Endemic fauna of Thailand
Moths described in 2002